Eresk District is in Boshruyeh County, South Khorasan province, Iran. At the 2006 National Census, its population (as a part of the former Boshruyeh District of Ferdows County) was 5,655 in 1,601 households. The following census in 2011 counted 5,843 people in 1,761 households, by which time the district had been separated from the county and Boshruyeh County established. At the latest census in 2016, the district had 5,973 inhabitants in 2,018 households.

References 

Boshruyeh County

Districts of South Khorasan Province

Populated places in South Khorasan Province

Populated places in Boshruyeh County